The 100 metres hurdles, or 100-meter hurdles, is a track and field event run mainly by women (the male counterpart is the 110 metres hurdles). The first hurdle is placed after a run-up of 13 metres from the starting line. The next 9 hurdles are set at a distance of 8.5 metres from each other, and the home stretch from the last hurdle to the finish line is 10.5 metres long. The hurdles are set up so that they will fall over if bumped into by the runner, but weighted so this is disadvantageous. Fallen hurdles do not count against runners provided that they do not run into them on purpose. Like the 100 metres sprint, the 100 m hurdles begins with athletes in starting blocks.

The fastest 100 m hurdlers run the distance in a time of around 12.5 seconds. The world record set by Tobi Amusan stands at 12.12 seconds.

History

The race started back in the 1830s in England where wooden barriers were placed along a 100 yard stretch. The hurdles event was included as part of the inaugural Women’s World Games in 1922, and made its first appearance in the Olympic Games in 1932 as 80m hurdles.

Starting with the 1972 Summer Olympics, the women's race was lengthened to 100m hurdles. 

The hurdles sprint race has been run by women since the beginning of women's athletics, just after the end of World War I. The distances and hurdle heights varied widely in the beginning. While the men had zeroed in on the 110 m hurdles, the International Women's Sport Federation had registered records for eight different disciplines by 1926 (60 yards/75 cm height, 60 yards/61 cm, 65 yards/75 cm, 83 yards/75 cm, 100 yards/75 cm, 100 yards/61 cm, 120 yards/75 cm, 110 metres/75 cm). At the first Women's World Games in 1922, a 100 m hurdles race was run.

Just like with the men's races, until 1935 no more than three hurdles could be knocked over, or the runner was disqualified, and records were only officially registered if the runner had cleared all her hurdles clean. 

In 1935, this rule was abandoned, and L-shaped hurdles were introduced that fell over forward easily and greatly reduced the risk of injury to the runner. Hurdles are weighted, so when properly set for the height (for women, closer to the fulcrum of the "L"), they serve as a consistent disadvantage to making contact with the barrier.

The 80 m hurdles was on the list of women's sports demanded by the International Women's Sport Federation for the Olympic Summer Games in 1928, but wasn't included as an Olympic discipline until 1932. Starting with 1949, the 80 m hurdles was one of the disciplines included in the women's pentathlon.

The first international event in the 100 m hurdles occurred at the European Athletics Championships, which were won by Karin Balzer of the GDR.

The modern 100 m race has an extra two hurdles compared to the 80 m race, which are higher and spaced slightly further apart. The home stretch is shorter by 1.5 m.

Currently, women run 110 m hurdles at the World Athletics Relays, a mixed team event, which was instituted in 2019.

Masters athletics
A version of the 100 metres hurdles is also used for 50- to 59-year-old men in Masters athletics. They run the same spacing as women, which coordinates with existing markings on most tracks, but run over 36-inch (0.914 m) hurdles.  In the 60-69 age range, the spacings are changed. Women over age 40 and men over age 70 run 80 metre versions with different heights and spacings.

Milestones
100 m hurdles:
First official time registered with hurdles of reduced height of : Pamela Kilborn, AUS, November 26, 1961
First official time with hurdles of standard height of : 15.1 seconds, Connie Pettersson, USA, May 28, 1966
First official world record: 13.3 seconds, Karin Balzer, GDR, June 20, 1969
First runner under 13 seconds: 12.9 seconds, Karin Balzer, GDR, September 5, 1969
First runner under 12.5 seconds:
12.3 seconds, Annelie Ehrhardt GDR, July 20, 1973 (last hand timed world record; electronically timed at 12.68 seconds)
12.48 seconds, Grażyna Rabsztyn, POL, June 10, 1978
First runner under 12.3 seconds: 12.29 seconds, Yordanka Donkova BUL, August 17, 1986
First runner under 12.2 seconds: 12.12 seconds, Tobi Amusan NGR, July 24, 2022. 12.06 seconds (wind aided) Tobi Amusan NGR, July 24, 2022.

First country to win gold, silver, and bronze in the women's 100 m hurdles in one Olympics: USA (Brianna Rollins, Nia Ali and Kristi Castlin), 2016; this was also the first time American women achieved such a sweep in any Olympic event

All-time top 25
Correct as of September 2022.

Assisted marks 
Any performance with a following wind of more than 2.0 metres per second does not count for record purposes. Below is a list of all wind-assisted times equal or superior to 12.37:

Tobi Amusan (NGR) ran 12.06 sec (+2.5) in Eugene, Oregon on 24 July 2022.
Britany Anderson (JAM) ran 12.23 sec (+2.5) in Eugene, Oregon on 24 July 2022.
Jasmine Camacho-Quinn (PUR) ran 12.23 sec (+2.5) in Eugene, Oregon on 24 July 2022 and 12.27 sec (+2.4) on 8 August 2022 in Székesfehérvár.
Cornelia Oschkenat (GDR) ran 12.28 sec (+2.7) in Berlin on 25 August 1987.
Yordanka Donkova (BUL) ran 12.29 sec (+3.5) in Lausanne on 24 June 1988.
Gail Devers (USA) ran 12.29 sec (+2.7) in Eugene, Oregon on 26 May 2002.
Lolo Jones (USA) ran 12.29 sec (+3.8) in Eugene, Oregon on 6 July 2008.
Brianna Rollins ran 12.30 (+2.8) on 22 June 2013, 12.33 (+2.3) on 21 June 2013 and 12.37 (+2.5) on 18 April 2018 in Des Moines, Iowa.
Alia Armstrong (USA) ran 12.31 sec (+2.5) in Eugene, Oregon on 24 July 2022 and 12.33 sec (+2.5) in Austin, Texas on 26 March 2022.
Kendra Harrison (USA) ran 12.32 sec (+3.9) in Austin, Texas on 26 March 2022.
Bettine Jahn (GDR) ran 12.35 sec (+2.4) in Helsinki on 13 August 1983.
Kellie Wells (USA) ran 12.35 sec (+3.7) in Gainesville, Florida on 16 April 2011
Dawn Harper (USA) ran 12.36 sec (+2.2) in Eugene, Oregon on 28 June 2009
Tonea Marshall (USA) ran 12.36 sec (+2.1) in Waco, Texas on 23 April 2022.
Gloria Siebert (GDR) ran 12.37 sec (+2.7) in Berlin on 25 August 1987.
Danielle Carruthers (USA) ran 12.37 sec (+3.4) in Eugene, Oregon on 26 June 2011.

Most successful athletes
Shirley Strickland (AUS): two Olympic victories, 1952 and 1956 in the 80 m hurdles.
Ludmila Narozhilenko-Engquist (URS)/(RUS)/(SWE): Olympic victory, 1996, two World Championship victories, 1991 and 1997.
Gail Devers (USA): three World Championships, 1993, 1995, 1999, as well as runner-up at the 1991 and 2001 World Championships. 
Sally Pearson (AUS): Olympic victory in 2012, as well as runner-up in 2008. World Championship victories in 2011 and 2017, as well as runner-up in 2013.
Brianna Rollins (USA): Olympic victory in 2016, World Championships 2013.

Olympic medalists

World Championships medalists

Season's bests

See also
 Women's 100 metres hurdles world record progression

External links

IAAF list of 100-metres-hurdles records in XML

Notes and references 
Amusan ran 12.06 at the Oregon World Championships, but the time is unofficial, due to +2.5 wind
Much of the content of this article comes from the equivalent German-language Wikipedia article (retrieved February 13, 2006).
All-Time List
Year Lists

Events in track and field
Women's athletics
Hurdling
Summer Olympic disciplines in athletics
Articles containing video clips
Sprint hurdles